Iolaus caesareus is a butterfly in the family Lycaenidae. It is found in Cameroon, the Republic of the Congo and the Democratic Republic of the Congo.

Subspecies
Iolaus caesareus caesareus (Cameroon, Democratic Republic of the Congo: Uele, Tshuapa and Equateur)
Iolaus caesareus cleopatrae Collins & Larsen, 2000 (Republic of the Congo)

References

External links

Images representing Iolaus caesareus at Barcodes of Life
Seitz, A. Die Gross-Schmetterlinge der Erde 13: Die Afrikanischen Tagfalter. Plate XIII 67 f

Butterflies described in 1895
Iolaus (butterfly)
Butterflies of Africa